Hammerfließ is a river of Brandenburg, Germany. It flows into the Nuthe near Woltersdorf.

See also
List of rivers of Brandenburg

External links

Rivers of Brandenburg
Rivers of Germany